WPOR is an FM radio station in Portland, Maine that broadcasts a country music radio format.  It is owned by Saga Communications. It broadcasts at 101.9 MHz.

History
WPOR has had the same format since it signed on as an FM simulcast of 1490 WPOR, now WBAE, on October 31, 1967. WPOR was owned by Hildreth Broadcasting Corporation at that time. On March 2, 1971 WPOR and WPOR-FM were sold to Ocean Coast Properties. 25 years later in March 1996 WPOR and WPOR-FM were sold again, this time to current owner Saga Communications for $10 million.

Through most of its history, the AM and the FM stations either simulcast, or for some years, the AM station used a satellite-delivered country music service, while live local announcers continued on the FM station.  In March 1999, 1490 AM changed its call letters to WBAE. The reason for the new call letters was made clear on May 24, 1999 when it changed its format to adult standards and became known on air as The Bay.

WPOR's Jon Shannon has hosted the POR Morning Crew since March 2001.

WPOR-FM had the greatest market share of any Maine radio station into the early 2000s, at which time it was still Portland's only country music station.  For many years, WPOR-FM and album-oriented rock station 102.9 WBLM were consistently Portland's top two stations, with each vying for the lead in the ratings.  The situation changed with the debut of WTHT in Portland, another country station.

References

External links

POR
Country radio stations in the United States
Radio stations established in 1967